Calidifontibacillus  is a genus of bacteria from the family of Bacillaceae.

References

Bacillaceae
Bacteria genera
Bacteria described in 2020